The 1887 Heathcote by-election was a by-election held on 8 February in the  electorate during the 9th New Zealand Parliament.

The by-election was caused by the death of the incumbent, John Coster on 17 December 1886.

He was replaced by Frederic Jones.

His opponent Aaron Ayers, the Mayor of Christchurch was expected to win the election.

Result
The following table gives the election result:

References

Heathcote, 1887
1887 elections in New Zealand
February 1887 events
Politics of Canterbury, New Zealand